Greatest Hits Live ... Now and Forever is a live album by British-Australian soft rock duo Air Supply, released in 1995. It also contains two new studio recordings of previously released songs. The album was a massive success in Asia, where in Taiwan it topped the album charts for 16 weeks. It was recorded in Taipei, Taiwan, and later a DVD of the concert was released. The band played live with a 16-piece string section.

Track listing 

 "The Vanishing Race" (Russell, Sherwood) 
 "Making Love Out of Nothing at All" (Steinman) – 5:46 
 "Chances" (Russell) – 3:46 
 "Lost in Love" (Russell) – 4:29 
 "Sweet Dreams" (Russell) – 7:14 
 "Someone" (Allison, Russell) – 5:45 
 "Always" (Allison, Russell, Sherwood) – 4:22 
 "Unchained Melody" (North, Zaret) – 3:48 
 "The One That You Love" (Russell) – 4:36 
 "Goodbye" (Foster, Thompson-Jenner)  4:03 
 "All Out of Love" (Davis, Russell) – 6:11 
 "I Can Wait Forever" (Foster, Russell)
 "Just Between the Lines" (Russell)
 "I Want to Give It All"  (Russell)
 "Here I Am (Just When I Thought I Was Over You)"  (Masser, Sallitt, Creed)
 "Don't Be Afraid" (Russell)
 "Without You" (Ham, Evans)
 "The Way I Feel" [Studio] (Allison, Russell) – 4:40 
 "Now and Forever" [Studio] (Russell) – 4:17

Personnel 
 Russell Hitchcock – lead and backing vocals
 Graham Russell – lead and backing vocals, keyboards, guitars 
 Guy Allison – acoustic piano, keyboards
 Clifford Rehrig – bass, backing vocals
 Mark T. Williams – drums, percussion, backing vocals

Production 
 Producer – Graham Russell
 Engineer and mixing – Alejandro Rodriguez
 Assistant engineer – Erich Gobel
 Design – Heather Porter

References 

Air Supply albums
1995 live albums
Warner Records live albums
Albums produced by Graham Russell